Fausto Bertoglio (born 13 January 1949) is a retired Italian professional road bicycle racer. The highlight of his career was his overall win in the 1975 Giro d'Italia with the Jollj Ceramica team.  It was the first Giro d'Italia victory on a Pinarello bicycle frameset. He also won the 1975 edition of the Volta a Catalunya. He finished third in the 1976 Giro d'Italia and ninth in the 1976 Tour de France.

Career achievements

Major results

1971
 9th Trofeo Alcide Degasperi
1972
 1st  Overall Settimana Bergamasca
 5th Overall Giro Ciclistico d'Italia
1974
 10th Overall Tour de Romandie
1975
 1st  Overall Giro d'Italia
1st Stage 14 (ITT)
 1st  Overall Volta a Catalunya
1st Stages 5 & 7b (ITT)
 2nd Coppa Bernocchi
 5th Gran Premio Città di Camaiore
 8th Giro del Veneto
 10th Giro dell'Emilia
 10th Gran Premio di Lugano
1976
 1st Coppa Placci
 1st Stage 7a (ITT) Volta a Catalunya
 3rd Overall Giro d'Italia
 5th Overall Giro di Puglia
 7th Coppa Bernocchi
 9th Overall Tour de France
1978
 5th Overall Tour de Romandie
 7th Overall Tirreno–Adriatico
 10th Overall Giro di Sardegna
1979
 7th Overall Giro d'Italia
 7th Overall Grand Prix du Midi Libre
 10th Milano–Torino

Grand Tour general classification results timeline

References

External links 

 
 Fausto Bertoglio, Memoire du Cyclisme 

1949 births
Living people
Italian male cyclists
Giro d'Italia winners
Cyclists from Brescia